Keiko Uchibori (born 13 October 1976) is a former Japanese cricketer who played five Women's One Day International cricket matches for Japan national women's cricket team in 2003.

References

1976 births
Living people
Japanese women cricketers